Moustapha Diané is a Guinean politician who represents the constituency of Dabola in the National Assembly. He is a member of the Majority Rally of the Guinean People Party of former president Alpha Conde. He is the president of the committee for monitoring the digitalisation work of the Assembly.

References

Members of the National Assembly (Guinea)
Living people
Year of birth missing (living people)
University of Geneva alumni
Gamal Abdel Nasser University of Conakry alumni